Rough and Ready Island is an island in the San Joaquin River, in the Sacramento–San Joaquin River Delta. It appears on 1913 and 2015 USGS map of the area.

The Rough and Ready Island Naval Supply Depot is located on the island.

References

Islands of San Joaquin County, California
Islands of the Sacramento–San Joaquin River Delta
Islands of Northern California